St Gerald's College is an Irish all-boys De La Salle secondary school located in Castlebar, County Mayo. As of September 2016, there are approximately 45 teachers and 600 students attending the school. The original school was opened in 1908. The current school was opened in 1971. In 2009, the school celebrated its centenary. A new extension was added to the school and opened in 2013.

Notable alumni

 Enda Kenny, former politician, Taoiseach of Ireland (2011–2017), and Leader of Fine Gael (2002–2017)  
 Micheál de Búrca (1912–1985), artist
 John Jordan, judge 
 Niall McGarry, entrepreneur
 Pádraig Flynn, former Fianna Fáil politician and Minister
 Richie Feeney, Gaelic footballer for Mayo
 Aidan O'Shea, Gaelic footballer for Mayo
 Cillian O'Connor, Gaelic footballer for Mayo
 Nicholas Quinn, Swimmer, competed at the 2016 Summer Olympics
 Ciaran Kelly, footballer.
 Ger Feeney (c. 1954–2010), Gaelic footballer for Mayo
 Martin Carney, Gaelic games commentator for RTÉ.

See also
 Education in the Republic of Ireland

References

External links
 St Gerald's College website

Secondary schools in County Mayo
Catholic secondary schools in the Republic of Ireland
1908 establishments in Ireland
Educational institutions established in 1908
Castlebar
Lasallian schools in Ireland